Denmark–Norway was an early modern multi-national and multi-lingual real union consisting of the Kingdom of Denmark, the Kingdom of Norway (including the then Norwegian overseas possessions: the Faroe Islands, Iceland, Greenland, and other possessions), the Duchy of Schleswig, and the Duchy of Holstein. The state also claimed sovereignty over three historical peoples: Frisians, Gutes and Wends. Denmark–Norway had several colonies, namely the Danish Gold Coast, the Nicobar Islands, Serampore, Tharangambadi, and the Danish West Indies. The union was also known as the Dano-Norwegian Realm (Det dansk-norske rige), Twin Realms (Tvillingerigerne) or the Oldenburg Monarchy (Oldenburg-monarkiet)

The state's inhabitants were mainly Danes, Norwegians and Germans, and also included Faroese, Icelanders and Inuit in the Norwegian overseas possessions, a Sami minority in northern Norway, as well as other indigenous peoples. The main cities of Denmark–Norway were Copenhagen, Christiania (Oslo), Altona, Bergen and Trondheim, and the primary official languages were Danish and German, but Norwegian, Icelandic, Faroese, Sami and Greenlandic were also spoken locally.

In 1380, Olaf II of Denmark inherited the Kingdom of Norway, titled as Olaf IV, after the death of his father Haakon VI of Norway, who was married to Olaf's mother Margaret I. Margaret I was ruler of Norway from her son's death in 1387 until her own death in 1412. Denmark, Norway, and Sweden established and formed the Kalmar Union in 1397. Following Sweden's departure in 1523, the union was effectively dissolved. From 1536/1537, Denmark and Norway formed a personal union that would eventually develop into the 1660 integrated state called Denmark–Norway by modern historians, at the time sometimes referred to as the "Twin Kingdoms." Prior to 1660, Denmark–Norway was de jure a constitutional and elective monarchy in which the King's power was somewhat limited; in that year it became one of the most stringent absolute monarchies in Europe.

The Dano-Norwegian union lasted until 1814, when the Treaty of Kiel decreed that Norway (except for the Faroe Islands, Iceland, and Greenland) be ceded to Sweden. The treaty however was not recognised by Norway, which resisted the attempt in the 1814 Swedish–Norwegian War. Norway thereafter entered into a much looser personal union with Sweden until 1905, when that union was dissolved and both kingdoms became independent.

Usage and extent
The term "Kingdom of Denmark" is sometimes used to include both countries in the period, since the political and economic power emanated from the Danish capital, Copenhagen. These terms cover the "royal territories" of the Oldenburgs as it was in 1460, excluding the "ducal territories" of Schleswig and Holstein. The administration used two official languages, Danish and German, and for several centuries both a Danish Chancellery and German Chancellery existed.

The term "Denmark–Norway" reflects the historical and legal roots of the union. It is adopted from the Oldenburg dynasty's official title. The kings always used the style "King of Denmark and Norway, the Wends and the Goths". Denmark and Norway, sometimes referred to as the "Twin Realms" of Denmark–Norway, had separate legal codes and currencies, and mostly separate governing institutions. Following the introduction of absolutism in 1660, the centralisation of government meant a concentration of institutions in Copenhagen. Centralisation was supported in many parts of Norway, where the two-year attempt by Sweden to control Trøndelag had met strong local resistance and resulted in a complete failure for the Swedes and a devastation of the province. This allowed Norway to further secure itself militarily for the future through closer ties with the capital Copenhagen. The term "Sweden–Finland" is sometimes, although with less justification, applied to the contemporary Swedish realm between 1521 and 1809. Finland was never a separate kingdom, and was completely integrated with Sweden, while Denmark was the dominant component in a personal union.

Colonies

Throughout the time of Denmark–Norway, it continuously had possession over various overseas territories. At the earliest times this meant areas in Northern Europe and North America, for instance Estonia and the Norwegian possessions of Greenland, the Faroe Islands and Iceland.

From the 17th century, the kingdoms acquired colonies in Africa, the Caribbean and India. At its height the empire was about 2,655,564.76 km2 (1,025,319 sq mi)

India

Denmark–Norway maintained numerous colonies from the 17th to 19th centuries over various parts around India. Colonies included the town of Tranquebar and Serampore. The last settlements it had control over were sold to the United Kingdom in 1845. Rights in the Nicobar Islands were sold in 1869.

Caribbean

Centred on the Virgin Islands, Denmark–Norway established the Danish West Indies. This colony was one of the longest-lived of Denmark, until it was sold to the United States in 1917. It became the U.S. Virgin Islands.

West Africa

In the Gold Coast region of West Africa, Denmark–Norway also over time had control over various colonies and forts. The last remaining forts were sold to the United Kingdom in 1850.

History

Origins of the Union

The three kingdoms Denmark, Norway and Sweden united in the Kalmar Union in 1397. Sweden broke out of this union and re-entered it several times, until 1521, when Sweden finally left the Union, leaving Denmark–Norway (including overseas possessions in the North Atlantic and the island of Saaremaa in modern Estonia). Norway also wanted to leave the union in the 1530s, but was unable to do so due to Denmark's superior military might. In 1537, Denmark invaded Norway, and annexed Norway under the Oldenburg monarch Christian III.

Northern Seven Years' War

The outbreak of the Northern Seven Years' War in 1563 is mainly attributed to Denmark's displeasure over the dismantling of the Kalmar Union in the 1520s. When the Danish-Norwegian king Christian III included the traditionally Swedish insignia of three crowns into his own coat of arms, the Swedes interpreted this as a Danish claim over Sweden. In response, Erik XIV of Sweden (reigned 1560–1568) added the insignia of Norway and Denmark to his own coat of arms.

After Swedish king Erik introduced obstacles in an attempt to hinder trade with Russia, Lübeck and the Polish–Lithuanian Commonwealth joined Denmark–Norway in a war alliance. Denmark–Norway then carried out some naval attacks on Sweden, which effectively started the war. After seven years of fighting, the conflict concluded in 1570 with a status quo ante bellum.

Kalmar War

Because of Denmark–Norway's dominion over the Baltic Sea (dominium maris baltici) and the North Sea, Sweden had the intention of avoiding paying Denmark's Sound Toll. Swedish king Charles IX's way of accomplishing this was to try to set up a new trade route through Lapland and northern Norway. In 1607 Charles IX declared himself "King of the Lapps in Nordland", and started collecting taxes in Norwegian territory.

Denmark-Norway and King Christian IV protested against the Swedish actions, as they had no intentions of letting another independent trade route open, Christian IV also had an intent of forcing Sweden to rejoin its union with Denmark-Norway. In 1611 Denmark-Norway finally invaded Sweden with 6000 men and took the city of Kalmar. On 20 January 1613, the Treaty of Knäred was signed in which Norway's land route from Sweden was regained by incorporating Lapland into Norway, and Swedish payment of the Älvsborg Ransom for two fortresses which Denmark-Norway had taken in the war. However, Sweden achieved an exemption from the Sound Toll, which had only previously been secured by England and the Dutch Republic.

Aftermath of the Älvsborg Ransom
The great ransom paid by Sweden (called the Älvsborg Ransom) was used by Christian IV, among many other things, to found the cities of Glückstadt, Christiania (refounded after a fire), Christianshavn, Christianstad and Christianssand. He also founded the Danish East India Company which led to the establishment of numerous Danish colonies in India.

Thirty Years' War

Not long after the Kalmar war, Denmark–Norway became involved in another greater war, in which they fought together with the mainly north German and other Protestant states against the Catholic states led by German Catholic League.

Christian IV sought to become the leader of the north German Lutheran states, however following the Battle of Lutter in 1626 Denmark met a crushing defeat. This led to most of the German Protestant states ceasing their support for Christian IV. After another defeat at the Battle of Wolgast and following the Treaty of Lübeck in 1629, which forbade Denmark–Norway from future intervening in German affairs, Denmark–Norways's participation in the war came to an end.

Torstenson War

Sweden was very successful during the Thirty Years' War, while Denmark–Norway failed to make gains. Sweden saw an opportunity of a change of power in the region. Denmark–Norway had territory surrounding Sweden which appeared threatening, and the Sound Dues were a continuing irritation for the Swedes. In 1643 the Swedish Privy Council determined that the chances of a gain in territory for Sweden in an eventual war against Denmark–Norway would be good. Not long after this, Sweden invaded Denmark–Norway.

Denmark was poorly prepared for the war, and Norway was reluctant to attack Sweden, which left the Swedes in a good position.

The war ended as foreseen with a Swedish victory, and with the Treaty of Brömsebro in 1645, Denmark–Norway had to cede some of their territories, including Norwegian territories Jemtland, Herjedalen and Idre & Serna, and the Danish Baltic Sea islands of Gotland and Ösel. Thus the Thirty Years' War facilitated rise of Sweden as a great power, while it marked the start of decline for Denmark-Norway.

Second Northern Wars

The Dano-Swedish War (1657–1658), a part of the Second Northern War, was one of the most devastating wars for the Dano-Norwegian kingdom. After a huge loss in the war, Denmark–Norway was forced in the Treaty of Roskilde to give Sweden nearly half its territory. This included Norwegian province of Trøndelag and Båhuslen, all remaining Danish provinces on the Swedish mainland, and the island of Bornholm.

However, two years later, in 1660, there was a follow-up treaty, the Treaty of Copenhagen, which gave Trøndelag and Bornholm back to Denmark–Norway.

Royal absolutist state
In the aftermath of Sweden's final secession from the Kalmar Union in 1521, civil war and the Protestant Reformation followed in Denmark and in Norway. When things had settled down, the Rigsraad (High Council) of Denmark became weak, and it was abolished in 1660; the Norwegian Riksråd had already been abolished de facto (the Norwegian Riksråd was assembled for the last time in 1537). In 1537, king Christian III of Denmark–Norway staged a coup d'état in Norway and made it a hereditary kingdom in a real union with Denmark. Norway kept its separate laws and some institutions, such as a royal chancellor, and separate coinage and army. Norway also had its own royal standard flag until 1748, after that the Dannebrog became the only official merchant flag in the union. Denmark–Norway became an absolutist state and Denmark a hereditary monarchy, as Norway de jure had been since 1537. These changes were confirmed in the Leges regiae signed on 14 November 1665, stipulating that all power lay in the hands of the king, who was only responsible to God.

Scanian War

Denmark had lost its provinces in Scania after the Treaty of Roskilde and was always eager to retrieve them, but as Sweden had grown into a great power it would not be an easy task. However, Christian V saw an opportunity when Sweden got involved in the Franco-Dutch War, and after some hesitation Denmark–Norway invaded Sweden in 1675.

Although the Danish-Norwegian assault began as a great success, the Swedes led by 19-year-old Charles XI counter-attacked and took back the land that was being occupied. The war was concluded with the French dictating peace, with no permanent gains or losses to either of the countries.

Napoleonic Wars and end of the Union

During the French Revolutionary Wars Denmark–Norway at first tried to stay neutral, so it could continue its trade with both France and the United Kingdom, but when it entered the League of Armed Neutrality, the British considered it a hostile action, and attacked Copenhagen in 1801 and again in 1807. In the 1807 attack on Copenhagen the British captured the entire Dano-Norwegian navy, burning most of the fleet and incorporating the remaining ships into the Royal Navy. The Dano-Norwegian navy was caught unprepared for any military operation and the British found the Dano-Norwegian navy still in dock after the winter season. The Dano-Norwegians were more concerned about preserving their continued neutrality and the entire Dano-Norwegian army was therefore gathered at Danevirke in the event of a French attack, leaving something undefended. The British attack of 1807 effectively forced the Dano-Norwegians into an alliance with the French, although without a fleet they could do little.

Denmark–Norway was defeated and had to cede the Kingdom of Norway to the King of Sweden at the Treaty of Kiel. Norway's overseas possessions were kept by Denmark. But the Norwegians objected to the terms of this treaty, and a constitutional assembly declared Norwegian independence on 17 May 1814 and elected the Crown Prince Christian Frederik as king of independent Norway. Following a Swedish invasion, Norway was forced to accept a personal union between Sweden and Norway, but retained its liberal constitution and separate institutions, except for the foreign service. The union was dissolved in 1905.

Culture

Differences between Denmark and Norway
After 1660, Denmark–Norway consisted of four formally separate parts (The Kingdom of Denmark, The Kingdom of Norway, The Duchy of Holstein and Duchy of Schleswig). Norway had its separate laws and some institutions, and separate coinage and army. Culturally and politically Denmark became dominant. While Denmark remained a largely agricultural society, Norway was industrialized from the 16th century and had a highly export-driven economy; Norway's shipping, timber and mining industries made Norway "the developed and industrialized part of Denmark-Norway" and an economic equal of Denmark. 

Denmark and Norway complemented each other and had a significant internal trade, with Norway relying on Danish agricultural products and Denmark relying on Norway's timber and metals. Norway was also the more egalitarian part of the twin kingdoms; in Norway the King (i.e. the state) owned much of the land, while Denmark was dominated by large noble landowners. Denmark had a serfdom-like institution known as Stavnsbånd which restricted men to the estates they were born on; all farmers in Norway on the other hand were free, could settle anywhere and were on average more affluent than Danish farmers. For many Danish people who had the possibility to leave Denmark proper, such as merchants and civil servants, Norway was seen as an attractive country of opportunities. The same was the case for the Norwegians, and many Norwegians migrated to Denmark, like the famous author Ludvig Holberg.

Languages

 Danish - officially recognized, dominant language, used by most of the unions nobilty, was also church language in Denmark, Norway, Greenland, the Faroe Islands and parts of Schleswig.
 High German - officially recognized, used by a minority of the nobility, and church language in Holstein and parts of Schleswig.
 Low German - not officially recognized, the main spoken language in Holstein and parts of Schleswig. Spoken to some degree mostly by Hanseatic traders In Bergen.
 Latin - commonly used in foreign relations, and popular as a second language among some of the nobility.
 Norwegian - not officially recognized, mostly used as a spoken language in Norway.
 Icelandic - recognized as a church language in Iceland after the Reformation, used as a spoken and written language in Iceland.
 Faroese - not officially recognized, mostly used as a spoken language on the Faroe Islands.
 Sámi - not officially recognized, mostly used as a spoken language in some part of Northern Norway. 
 Greenlandic - not officially recognized, mostly used as a spoken language in Greenland.
 North Frisian - not officially recognized, mostly used as a spoken language in some parts of Schleswig.

Religion
Denmark–Norway was among the countries to follow Martin Luther after the Protestant Reformation, and thus established Lutheran Protestantism as official religion in place of Roman Catholicism. Lutheran Protestantism prevailed through most of the union's life span.

There was however one other religious "reformation" in the kingdom during the rule of Christian VI, a follower of Pietism. The period from 1735 until his death in 1746 has been nicknamed "the State Pietism", as new laws and regulations were established in favor of Pietism. Though Pietism did not last for a substantial time, numerous new small pietistic resurrections occurred over the next 200 years. In the end, Pietism was never firmly established as a lasting religious grouping.

Legacy
Although the Dano–Norwegian union was generally viewed favourably in Norway at the time of its dissolution in 1814, some 19th-century Norwegian writers disparaged the union as a "400-year night". Historians describe the idea of a "400-year night" as a myth that was created as a rhetorical device in the struggle against the Swedish–Norwegian union, inspired by 19th-century national-romanticist ideas. Since the late 19th century the Danish–Norwegian union was increasingly viewed in a more nuanced and favourable light in Norway with a stronger focus on empirical research, and historians have highlighted that the Norwegian economy thrived and that Norway was one of the world's wealthiest countries during the entire period of real union with Denmark. Historians have also pointed out that Norway was a separate state, with its own army, legal system and other institutions, with significant autonomy in its internal affairs, and that it was primarily governed by a local elite of civil servants who identified as Norwegian, albeit in the name of the Danish King. Norwegians were also well represented in the military, civil service and business elites of Denmark–Norway, and in the administration of the colonies in the Caribbean and elsewhere. Norway benefited militarily from the combined strength of Denmark–Norway in the wars with Sweden and economically from its trade relationship with Denmark in which Norwegian industry enjoyed a legal monopoly in Denmark while Denmark supplied Norway with agricultural products.

See also

 Kingdom of Norway (1814)
 Military history of Denmark
 Military history of Norway
 Possessions of Norway
 Union between Sweden and Norway
 Dano-Norwegian language

Notes

References

 
Denmark–Norway relations
Danish monarchy
Norwegian monarchy
History of Iceland
History of the Faroe Islands
History of Greenland
Scandinavian history
1536 establishments in Europe
1537 establishments in Europe
1660 establishments in Europe
States and territories disestablished in 1814
Personal unions
Real unions